James Christopher Jensen (born November 14, 1958) is a former professional American football wide receiver, running back, tight end and quarterback who played for the Miami Dolphins from 1981 to 1992 of the National Football League and for the Miami Hooters of the Arena Football League. He played quarterback for the Boston University Terriers where he compiled a 17-3-1 record as a starter and was named the Offensive Player of the Year in the Yankee Conference as well as All-Conference.

He attended Central Bucks High School West in Bucks County, Pennsylvania.

Nicknamed "Crash", he played 14 seasons in Miami, 2 for the Arena Football Hooters and 12 for the NFL Dolphins, where his best years came while teamed with quarterback Dan Marino and head coach Don Shula. 

Jensen wore jersey # 11 because he entered the league as a quarterback. After Marino was selected in the 1983 NFL Draft, it became evident that Jensen would need to find another way to survive on the Dolphins roster. He became a human Swiss army knife, with a knack for making tackles on punt and kickoff coverages and converting third down opportunities as a running back or wide receiver in the offensive set with Marino. On Mexican TV he was known as The Thousand Uses or El mil usos in Spanish, due to his versatility.

His best season statistically was in 1989 with 61 receptions for 557 yards and 6 touchdowns receiving, with 8 rushing attempts for 50 yards, and 1 passing attempt and completion for a 19-yard touchdown. He was named the Dolphins special teams MVP in 1988. Jensen finished his 12 NFL seasons with 229 receptions for 2,171 yards and 19 touchdowns. He also passed for two touchdowns. In 1989, he caught Dan Marino's 200th career touchdown pass. Jim was also the 1988 NFL Special teams player of the year. In 2000, he served as the head coach for the Miami Tropics of the Spring Football League. He was selected the 2006 Miami Dolphins "Unsung Hero".

References

External links
 Official website

1958 births
Living people
American football wide receivers
American football quarterbacks
Boston University Terriers football players
Boston University alumni
Miami Dolphins players
Miami Hooters players
Players of American football from Pennsylvania
Florida Firecats coaches
Florida Bobcats coaches
Orlando Predators coaches